Anne Beaufour is a French billionaire businesswoman. She is a descendant of Henri Beaufour, founder of the Beaufour laboratories, ancestor of the French biopharmaceutical company Ipsen.

Biography 
Born on August 8, 1963 in Neuilly-sur-Seine, Anne Beaufour is the daughter of Albert Beaufour, who died in 2000, and the granddaughter of Dr. Henri Beaufour, founder of the Ipsen group. 

She holds a degree in geology from the University of Paris-Sud. She married Michel Audibert in 1999. 

When Albert Beaufour died in 2000, the 76% of the capital held by the family was divided between the three brothers and sisters. One of the daughters, Véronique Beaufour, sold her share, representing 6% of the capital. Anne and her brother Henri Beaufour thus control 57% of the Ipsen group, and both sit on the Board of Directors of Ipsen and Mayroy, the Ipsen controlling holding company. Their share in Ipsen is still 52% in 2020.  

In 2020, her fortune is estimated between 2 and 3.2 billion euros by Forbes, Challenges and Capital, which makes her the 1990th fortune in the world according to Forbes and one of the most important French fortunes,.

References

1963 births
French billionaires
Living people
French expatriates in Switzerland